The Alcyonides (Alkyonides) were, in Greek mythology, the seven daughters of the giant Alcyoneus.

Names 
These sisters were identified individually as, Alkippe, Anthe, Asteria, Drimo, Methone, Pallene and Phthonia (Phosthonia or Chthonia).

Mythology 
When their father Alcyoneus was slain by Heracles, the Alcyonides threw themselves into the sea from Kanastraion, which is the peak of Pellene. They were transformed into halcyons (kingfishers) by Amphitrite.

Legacy

Islands
The Alkyonides are also small rocky islands in the Corinthian Gulf very close to the coast of Attica, Peloponnese and Central Greece, taking their name from the mythological figures. They reported a 2001 census population of nine inhabitants and are administratively part of the municipality of Loutraki-Perachora in Corinthia.

Climate
The term Alkyonides also refers to a meteorological phenomenon of the central Greek climate. Nearly every year in the period after Christmas until the middle of January there is a non-interrupted period of days with clear blue skies and warm temperatures, which at least in the Athens region can reach more than 20°C over the day.

Astronomy

The Saturnian moons Methone, Anthe and Pallene are named after three of the Alkyonides.

Notes

Reference 

 Suida, Suda Encyclopedia translated by Ross Scaife, David Whitehead, William Hutton, Catharine Roth, Jennifer Benedict, Gregory Hays, Malcolm Heath Sean M. Redmond, Nicholas Fincher, Patrick Rourke, Elizabeth Vandiver, Raphael Finkel, Frederick Williams, Carl Widstrand, Robert Dyer, Joseph L. Rife, Oliver Phillips and many others. Online version at the Topos Text Project.
Women in Greek mythology

Metamorphoses into birds in Greek mythology
Characters in Greek mythology